Monopoly money is a type of play money used in the board game Monopoly. It is different from most currencies, including the American currency or British currency upon which it is based, in that it is smaller, one-sided, and does not have different imagery for each denomination. It is not legal tender and has no monetary value in any jurisdictions.

Format

Many variations of Monopoly exist, with many types of money representing various currencies. In the more "standard" versions of the game, Monopoly money consists entirely of notes. Monopoly notes come in the following colors:

 $1 - White
 $2 - Yellow (available in Monopoly Junior)
 $3 - Blue (available in Monopoly Junior)
 $4 - Green (available in Monopoly Junior)
 $5 - Pink
 $10 - Yellow (classic) or blue (recent editions)
 $20 - Green
 $50 - Blue (classic) or purple (recent editions)
 $100 - Red (early editions) or beige
 $500 - Gold (classic) or orange (recent editions)
 $1,000 (available only in Monopoly: The Mega Edition) - Purple (original) or yellow (recent editions)

The modern Monopoly game has its Monopoly money denominated in $1, $5, $10, $20, $50, $100, $500, and (in some editions) $1,000, with all but the last two paralleling the denominations in circulation in the United States. (The U.S. $500 bill and U.S. $1000 bill were withdrawn in 1969). Monopoly does not include a two-dollar bill; however, Monopoly Junior did include the two in addition to three and four denominations (which do not exist in U.S. currency) for many years. (Monopoly Junior later simplified its system to include only one-dollar bills.)

Fans have designed unofficial $1,000 Monopoly bills for longer games and made them available online.

Special editions and spinoffs (e.g. Monopoly Deal) may use larger denominations. 

More recent Monopoly games use a Monopoly-specific currency symbol of a double struck-through capital letter M, similar to the Won sign (₩) flipped upside-down.

As a phrase
"Monopoly money" is also a derisive term used in multiple senses. The most common is by countries that have traditionally had monochromatic currency banknotes (such as the United States) to refer to countries that have colorful banknotes (such as Canada). This has been used in places such as the "Weird Al" Yankovic song "Canadian Idiot".

It can also be used as a derisive term to refer to money not really worth anything, or at least not being used as if it is worth anything.

References

External links

Money
Monopoly (game)
Virtual economies